Robert "Trey" Ray Hutchens III (born May 20, 1998) is an American professional stock car racing driver. He last competed part-time in the NASCAR Camping World Truck Series, driving the No. 14 Chevrolet Silverado for his family team, Trey Hutchens Racing. He has also competed in what is now the ARCA Menards Series East part-time since 2013, with most of his starts coming with his own team as well. Hutchens also drove in the former NASCAR Whelen Southern Modified Tour for two years.

Racing career

Truck Series
Hutchens debuted in the Truck Series in 2017 at Iowa, where he drove the No. 66 for Bolen Motorsports and finished 16th in that race.

He returned to the Truck Series in 2019 at Charlotte driving the No. 14 for his own team, but failed to qualify. He did qualify for the Texas race in June and finished 24th. After failing to qualify for multiple races due to the large number of entries that year, Hutchens moved to the full-time No. 8 truck for NEMCO Motorsports to run at Iowa, the same thing that Tony Mrakovich had done with his upstart team.

Hutchens returned to his own No. 14 truck for the 2020 season, planning to make his first attempt of the season at Charlotte as he did the previous year. However, with no qualifying for the weekend and his team not having enough owner points, they were excluded from the race and failed to qualify again. He came back the next weekend at Atlanta Motor Speedway, but failed to qualify again. Hutchens qualified at Kentucky Speedway, Michigan Speedway and Texas Motor Speedway, posting a best finish of 29th at Michigan.

He came back in 2021, but failed to qualify in the Fr8Auctions 200, ToyotaCare 250, WISE Power 200, and the LiftKits4Less.com 200. He did eventually qualify for his first North Carolina Education Lottery 200 after Spencer Davis and Ray Ciccarelli withdrew. He locked up in a bad crash with Johnny Sauter that obliterated Sauter's right side and Hutchens' driver side. Both drivers were okay. Drew Dollar though, survived the crash after spinning out from Sauter.

According to the entry list, Hutchens would make his first start of the 2022 season at Kansas Speedway

Personal life
Hutchens attended North Carolina State University where he majored in engineering and minored in computer programming. He also is a graduate of North Davidson High School, where he was the senior class president. He is the son of Bobby Hutchens Jr, a longtime NASCAR race team executive who worked in a variety of positions for Richard Childress Racing and was also the competition director for Stewart-Haas Racing and later JTG Daugherty Racing, and is currently the crew chief for his son's No. 14 truck.

Hutchens' mother, Sharon, died of breast cancer when he was age eleven and in middle school.

Motorsports career results

NASCAR
(key) (Bold – Pole position awarded by qualifying time. Italics – Pole position earned by points standings or practice time. * – Most laps led.)

Camping World Truck Series

K&N Pro Series East

Whelen Southern Modified Tour

 Season still in progress 
 Ineligible for series points

References

External links
 
 

Living people
NASCAR drivers
1998 births
Racing drivers from North Carolina
People from Lexington, North Carolina